Mr. Lucky is a 1991 album by American blues singer, songwriter and guitarist John Lee Hooker. Produced by Ry Cooder, Roy Rogers and Carlos Santana under the executive production of Mike Kappus, the album featured musicians including Keith Richards, Blues Hall of Fame inductee Johnny Winter; and three inductees of the Rock and Roll Hall of Fame, Van Morrison, Booker T. Jones and Johnnie Johnson. Released on Virgin Records, including on its imprint label Classic Records, Mr. Lucky peaked at #101 on the "Billboard 200".

History
In 1989, John Lee Hooker achieved commercial and critical success with The Healer, an album which paired him with musicians including Carlos Santana  and Bonnie Raitt, with whom Hooker shared a Grammy Award for "Best Traditional Blues Recording" for the track "In the Mood". With Mr. Lucky, producers Cooder, Rogers and Santana follow the same successful formula, to mixed critical reviews; Rolling Stone praised the album as a refinement over its predecessor with an "all around...sharper fit", its notable guests serving as "superb sidemen for a great bluesman". Entertainment Weekly, by contrast, described the album as essentially "a tribute album" where "most of the tunes...don't sound like Hooker at all". In spite of mixed reception, the album charted well, reaching #101 on the "Billboard 200" chart in 1991 and also enjoying international sales success. It was nominated for, but did not win, a Grammy.

Track listing
All songs composed by John Lee Hooker (except where noted).
 "I Want to Hug You" (Hooker, Al Smith) – 2:52
 "Mr. Lucky" (Hooker, Smith) – 4:38
 "Backstabbers" (Hooker, Smith) – 5:01
 "This Is Hip" – 3:23
 "I Cover the Waterfront" – 6:39
 "Highway 13" – 6:32
 "Stripped Me Naked" (Hooker, Benny Rietveld, Carlos Santana, Chester Thompson) – 4:18
 "Susie" – 4:23
 "Crawlin' King Snake" (Tony Hollins, Bernard Besman, Hooker) – 3:20
 "Father Was a Jockey" – 4:58

Personnel

Performance

 Kenny Baker – saxophone
 Gaylord Birch – drums
 Bowen Brown – drums
 Albert Collins – guitar
 Tom Compton – drums
 Ry Cooder – guitar
 Richard Cousins – bass
 Robert Cray – guitar, vocals
 Maurice Cridlin – bass
 Steve Ehrmann – bass
 Terry Evans – vocals
 Jeff Ganz – bass
 William "Bill" Greene – vocals
 Jim Guyett – bass
 John P. Hammond – harmonica, slide guitar
 Kevin Hayes – drums
 John Lee Hooker – guitar, vocals
 Johnnie Johnson – piano
 Booker T. Jones – organ
 Deacon Jones – organ
 Tim Kaihatsu – guitar
 Jim Keltner – drums
 Bobby King – vocals
 Nick Lowe – bass
 Scott Mathews – drums
 Van Morrison – guitar, vocals
 Michael Osborn – guitar
 Karl Perazzo – timbales
 Jimmy Pugh – organ
 Raul Rekow – conga
 Keith Richards – guitar
 Benny Rietveld – bass
 Carlos Santana – guitar
 Larry Taylor – bass
 Chester Thompson – keyboards
 Johnny Winter – guitar

Production
 Carol Bobolts – design
 Ry Cooder – producer
 Arne Frager – engineer, mixing
 Mike Kappus – executive producer, concept, talent coordinator
 Samuel Lehmer – engineer, mixing
 Roy Rogers – producer
 Steve Samiof – art direction
 Carlos Santana – producer
 Allen Sides – engineer

Charts

Certifications

References

John Lee Hooker albums
1991 albums
Albums produced by Van Morrison
Albums produced by Roy Rogers (guitarist)
Albums produced by Ry Cooder